Carcinisation (or carcinization) is an example of convergent evolution in which a crustacean evolves into a crab-like form from a non-crab-like form. The term was introduced into evolutionary biology by L. A. Borradaile, who described it as "one of the many attempts of Nature to evolve a crab". Most carcinised crustaceans belong to the infraorder Anomura.

Definition of carcinised morphology 
It was stated by Lancelot Alexander Borradaile in 1916 that:

Keiler et al., 2017 defines a carcinised morphology as follows:

 "The carapace is flatter than it is broad and possesses lateral margins"
 "The sternites are fused into a wide sternal plastron which possesses a distinct emargination on its posterior margin."
 "The pleon is flattened and strongly bent, in dorsal view completely hiding the tergites of the fourth pleonal segment, and partially or completely covers the plastron"

Examples 
Carcinisation is believed to have occurred independently in at least five groups of decapod crustaceans:
 Order Decapoda:
Infraorder Anomura:
 King crabs, which most scientists believe evolved from hermit crab ancestors First appearance: Late Cenozoic
 Porcelain crabs, which are closely related to squat lobsters First appearance: Late Jurassic
 The hairy stone crab (Lomis hirta)
 Hermit crabs:
 The coconut crab (Birgus latro)
 Patagurus rex
 Infraorder Brachyura (true crabs) First appearance: Early Jurassic
The extinct probable crustacean order Cyclida are also noted to "strikingly resemble crabs", and probably had a similar ecology.

King crabs 

The example of king crabs (family Lithodidae) evolving from hermit crabs has been particularly well studied, and evidence in their biology supports this theory. For example, most hermit crabs are asymmetrical, so that they fit well into spiral snail shells; the abdomens of king crabs, even though they do not use snail shells for shelter, are also asymmetrical.

Hypercarcinisation 
An exceptional form of carcinisation, termed "hypercarcinisation", is seen in the porcelain crab Allopetrolisthes spinifrons. In addition to the shortened body form, A. spinifrons also shows similar sexual dimorphism to that seen in true crabs, where males have a shorter pleon than females.

Decarcinization 

Some crab shaped species have evolved away from the crab form in a process known as decarcinisation. Decarcinization, or the loss of the crab-like body, has actually occurred multiple times in both Brachyura and Anomura.  However, there are varying degrees of carcinization and decarcinization. Thus, not all species can necessarily be classified as "carcinized" or "decarcinized." Some examples include the coconut crab as well as other hermit crabs that have lost or reduced their outer casing, often referred to as "domiciles." While they retain their crab-like phenotype, their reduction or lack of domicile necessitates a "semi-carcinized" label.

See also 

List of examples of convergent evolution
Cretaceous crab revolution
Mesozoic marine revolution

References 

Crustaceans
Evolutionary biology